The 2019–20 Grambling State Tigers men's basketball team represented Grambling State University in the 2019–20 NCAA Division I men's basketball season. The Tigers, led by third-year head coach Donte Jackson, played their home games at the Fredrick C. Hobdy Assembly Center in Grambling, Louisiana as members of the Southwestern Athletic Conference. They finished the season 17–15, 11–7 in SWAC play to finish in a three-way tie for fourth place. They lost in the quarterfinals of the SWAC tournament to Texas Southern.

Previous season
The Tigers finished the 2018–19 season 17–17 overall, 10–8 in SWAC play, to finish in three-way tie for 3rd place. In the SWAC tournament, they defeated Arkansas–Pine Bluff in the quarterfinals, before losing to Prairie View A&M in the semifinals. They were invited to the CIT, where they lost to Texas–Rio Grande Valley in the first round.

Roster

Schedule and results

|-
!colspan=12 style=| Non-conference regular season

|-
!colspan=9 style=| SWAC regular season

|-
!colspan=12 style=| SWAC tournament
|-

|-

Source

References

Grambling State Tigers men's basketball seasons
Grambling State Tigers
Grambling State Tigers men's basketball
Grambling State Tigers men's basketball